At the 2013 Asian Youth Games, the athletics events were held in Nanjing, Jiangsu province in China from 19–22 August. A total of 34 events were contested, split evenly between the sexes. The Nanjing Olympic Sports Centre was the host stadium for the athletics – this was the venue's second hosting of a multi-sport event after the 2005 National Games of China.

The events attracted average crowds of 20,000 people per day to the stadium. The competition was open to any youth athletes aged fifteen or sixteen. It was part of the buildup to the 2014 Youth Olympics, to be held at the same location. A total of 376 athletes from 37 nations participated at the event. Indian athletes were entered as Independent Olympic Participants due to the suspension of the Indian Olympic Association. Poor organisation between the Athletics Federation of India and the national association meant the country sent eighteen athletes who was born before 1997 and could not compete due to their being over the age limit. One of Myanmar's two entrants was dismissed for the same reason.

The host nation China easily topped the medal table, taking over half the available gold medals (18) and ending the competition with a total of 33 medals. Japan won the next most gold medals with four in their haul of nine medals. Third and fourth placers Thailand and Chinese Taipei shared the second largest medal hauls, each having three golds in their totals of eleven medals. Sri Lanka entered ten athletes, four of them won a medal for their country. Three of North Korea's four entrants also won a medal. Eighteen teams reached the medal table.

Chinese sprinter Huang Guifen was the only athlete to win two gold medals, having won the girl's 200 metres and 400 metres events. Japan's Yume Ando was a double silver medallist in the boy's throws (discus and shot put) and Nutthapong Veeravongratanasiri of Thailand was runner-up in both the boy's short sprints. A fourth multiple medallist was Iranian Ata Asadi who reached the podium in both middle-distance running events. The standard of performances was much higher than the inaugural edition in 2009 and only ten of the games records from that event went unbeaten. Twenty-six new games records were set, with eight new events being introduced (200 m, 3000 metres, 2000 m steeplechase and hammer throw for both sexes).

The team of athletics officials was led by Singapore's Maurice R. Nicholas, one of the country's top coaches. An anti-doping programme was led by Japan's Fumihiro Yamasawa.

Several athletes who competed at the 2013 World Youth Championships in Athletics a month previously were present at the games.

Medalists

Boys

Girls

Medal table

Results

Boys

100 m

Round 1
19 August

Semifinals
20 August

Final
20 August

200 m

Round 1
21 August

Semifinals
22 August

Final
22 August

400 m
20 August

800 m

Round 1
21 August

Final
22 August

1500 m
20 August

3000 m
22 August

110 m hurdles

Round 1
20 August

Final
21 August

400 m hurdles

Round 1
21 August

Final
22 August

2000 m steeplechase
21 August

High jump
22 August

Pole vault
19 August

Long jump

Qualification
19 August

Final
20 August

Triple jump
21 August

Shot put
19 August

Discus throw
22 August

Hammer throw
20 August

Javelin throw
19 August

Girls

100 m

Round 1
19 August

Semifinals
20 August

Final
20 August

200 m

Round 1
21 August

Semifinals
22 August

Final
22 August

400 m

Round 1
19 August

Final
20 August

800 m

Round 1
21 August

Final
22 August

1500 m
20 August

3000 m
22 August

100 m hurdles

Round 1
20 August

Final
21 August

400 m hurdles
22 August

2000 m steeplechase
21 August

High jump
19 August

Pole vault
20 August

Long jump

Qualification
20 August

Final
21 August

Triple jump
22 August

Shot put
21 August

Discus throw
22 August

Hammer throw
20 August

Javelin throw
21 August

References

Results
Athletics Schedule and Results. Asian Youth Games 2013. Retrieved on 2013-08-24.
Medallists by Event. Asian Youth Games 2013. Retrieved on 2013-08-24.

External links
Official website
Competition schedule

2013
2013 Asian Youth Games events
Asian Youth Games
2013 Asian Youth Games